Frederick W. and Mary Karau Pott House is a historic home located at Cape Girardeau, Missouri.  It was built about 1885, and is a -story, Italianate style brick dwelling.  It has a side-gabled roof, a projecting pedimented front gable and parapet chimneys.  It features an overhanging eave with curvilinear brackets and modillions, tall narrow windows with round and segmental arches, and an ornate central portico supported by groups of chamfered columns.

It was listed on the National Register of Historic Places in 1999.

References

Houses on the National Register of Historic Places in Missouri
Italianate architecture in Missouri
Houses completed in 1885
Houses in Cape Girardeau County, Missouri
National Register of Historic Places in Cape Girardeau County, Missouri
1885 establishments in Missouri